Curriehill railway station is located in Currie, a southwestern suburb of the city of Edinburgh, Scotland, not far from the main campus of Heriot-Watt University.

The station has two platforms, connected by a stairway footbridge, and is equipped with CCTV. It is managed by ScotRail.

History 
Curriehill is a reopened station. The original Curriehill (called "Currie") opened on 15 February 1848, and was closed by British Railways on 31 March 1951. The present station (which occupies the site of the old station) opened on 5 October 1987.

Services 
Curriehill is currently served on Mondays to Saturdays by an approximately hourly ScotRail service in each direction, to Edinburgh Waverley and Glasgow Central. Two trains per day run to Motherwell (one in the evening peak running via Shotts and one late night service via Carstairs), whilst one starts back from there. On Sundays the service is more limited, with two-hourly departures each way after midday.

The staple passenger traction calling at this station is the Class 385, although the occasional Class 380 can also be used. Avanti West Coast and TransPennine Express services pass though the station without stopping.

Sources

External links 

Video footage of Curriehill station

Railway stations in Edinburgh
Former Caledonian Railway stations
Railway stations in Great Britain opened in 1848
Railway stations in Great Britain closed in 1951
Railway stations in Great Britain opened in 1987
Reopened railway stations in Great Britain
Railway stations served by ScotRail